Aelurillus quadrimaculatus, is a species of spider of the genus Aelurillus. It is native to India and Sri Lanka.

References

Salticidae
Spiders described in 1889
Spiders of Asia
Fauna of Sri Lanka